Sean Conway (born 1981) is a Zimbabwean endurance adventurer, author and motivational speaker, who became the first person to cycle, swim, and run the length of Great Britain, from Land's End to John o' Groats. In 2016 he completed the world's longest triathlon, a 4,200 mile journey around the coast of Britain.

Early years 

Conway was born in Harare, Zimbabwe on 6 April 1981. He later attended Hilton College in South Africa. He lived in Cheltenham for a number of years before moving to the Lake District in 2016. In 2020 he moved to Wales.

He earns his living as an adventurer, author and public speaker.

Swimming 

Starting on 30 June 2013, Conway set out to swim from Land's End in the south-west of Great Britain, to John o' Groats, in the north, travelling up the west coast of Great Britain and via the east coast of Ireland. He completed the swim on 11 November, the first person to do so, having swum , in 135 days, 90 of which were spent in the water, the others avoiding contrary tides, resting, and avoiding bad weather, sometimes ashore and sometimes on his support yacht. He grew a thick beard to help prevent jellyfish stinging his face.

He used the achievement to raise money for the charity War Child.

Triathlon 
Sean Conway became the first person to complete an "ultimate triathlon" when he finished running from John O' Groats to Land's End, having already cycled and swum the entire way before. The run was made into a two-part documentary called Sean Conway:Running Britain for Discovery Channel UK. Sean Conway completed the "ultimate triathlon" unsupported, without the support of a team and lifeboats.

Cycling 
Sean took the record for the fastest, unsupported crossing of Europe by bicycle  in March 2018.  Starting in Cabo de Roca on the west coast of Portugal, he successfully cycled nearly 4,000 miles, finishing at the Russian town of Ufa in 24 days, 18 hours and 39 minutes. The movie Europe or Bust covers this trip. It was later superseded by Leigh Timmis the same year.

Bibliography

References 

Going Solo Adventures Q&A Session with Sean Conway Part 1

External links 
 

1981 births
Living people
Male long-distance swimmers
Sportspeople from Harare
Sportspeople from Cheltenham
Ultra-distance cyclists
Cycling writers
Alumni of Hilton College (South Africa)